Madeleine Blinkhorn-Jones (born 20 April 2003) is an English cricketer who currently plays for Surrey and South East Stars. She plays as a right-handed batter.

Domestic career
Blinkhorn-Jones first played for the Surrey senior side in 2020, against Kent in the Women's London Championship. She went on to play two matches for Surrey in the 2021 Women's Twenty20 Cup, without batting. She also appeared for Surrey in their victorious 2021 Women's London Championship campaign, and was the second-highest run-scorer across the competition, with 138 runs including a high score of 62. She played six matches for Surrey in the 2022 Women's Twenty20 Cup, scoring 52 runs.

Blinkhorn-Jones was named in the South East Stars Academy squad in 2021. She was again named in the Academy squad in 2022. In August 2022, she scored 93 for South East Stars 2nd XI, against Central Sparks 2nd XI. She was named in a matchday squad for the first team for the first time on 8 September 2022, and made her debut for the side on 17 September 2022, in the Rachael Heyhoe Flint Trophy against Lightning.

References

External links

2003 births
Living people
Place of birth missing (living people)
Surrey women cricketers
South East Stars cricketers